Throana is a genus of moths of the family Erebidae erected by Francis Walker in 1859. It consists of very small, slender species found mainly in Sundaland, with at least three species in Sulawesi, and outlying species in Seram and Australia.

Species
 Throana amyntoralis Walker, 1858
 Throana blechrodes Turner, 1903
 Throana callista Prout, 1926 
 Throana flavizonata Hampson, 1926 
 Throana ionodes Hampson, 1926 
 Throana klossi Prout, 1932 
 Throana lasiocera Hampson, 1926 
 Throana pectinifer Hampson, 1897 
 Throana rufipicta Hampson, 1926

References

Calpinae
Glossata genera